Nectophrynoides laticeps is a species of toad in the family Bufonidae. It is endemic to the Ukaguru Mountains of Tanzania. Common name wide-headed viviparous toad has been proposed for it.

Description
Nectophrynoides laticeps measure  in snout–urostyle length, the largest specimen being the female holotype. This toad can be distinguished from the other known species of the genus by a combination of morphological characters, and has an advertisement call different from all other recorded calls of Nectophrynoides. The dorsal and ventral coloration is variable with a pink tinge. It is probably ovoviviparous – the eggs remain within the mother's body until they hatch.

Habitat and conservation
It is active during the day and at night. It appears to be common within its small range. However, the forests in the Ukaguru Mountains are poorly protected, and this species is probably suffering from habitat loss. It is present in the Mamiwa-Kisara Forest Reserve.

References

laticeps
Frogs of Africa
Amphibians of Tanzania
Endemic fauna of Tanzania
Amphibians described in 2005